Gorinchem is a railway station in the town of Gorinchem, Netherlands. It is on the MerwedeLingelijn. It was opened on 1 December 1883. Train services are operated by Qbuzz.

The original railway building was built to look like Sneek railway station, a building type known in Dutch as "Standaardtype Sneek". The current railway building, designed by Cees Douma, was opened in 1971, and the old building was demolished.

Train service
The station is served by the following services:
2x per hour local services (stoptrein) Dordrecht - Gorinchem - Geldermalsen
2x per hour local services (stoptrein) Dordrecht - Gorinchem

Bus services
The following bus services stop at Station Gorinchem:

47, 73, 74, 76, 77, 78, 79, 81, 121, 181, 228, 230, 231, 387, 674, 701, 705

Destinations by Bus include:

Geldermalsen, Leerdam, Gelkenes, Giessenburg, Giessen-Oudekerk, Hardinxveld-Giessendam, Hardinxveld, Sliedrecht, Utrecht, Arkel, Gorinchem Town

For more information on the routes see

External links
Qbuzz website 
Dutch Public Transport journey planner 

Railway stations in South Holland
Railway stations opened in 1883
Railway stations on the Merwede-Lingelijn
Gorinchem